The 1972 Virginia Slims Masters was a women's singles tennis tournament played on outdoor clay court at the Bartlett Park Tennis Center in St. Petersburg, Florida in the United States. The event was part of the 1972 WT Woman's Pro Tour. It was the second edition of the tournament and was held from April 11 through April 16, 1972. Second-seeded Nancy Gunter won the singles title and earned $3,400 first-prize money.

Finals

Singles
 Nancy Gunter defeated  Chris Evert 6–3, 6–4

Doubles
 Karen Krantzcke /  Wendy Overton defeated  Judy Tegart /  Françoise Dürr 7–5, 6–4

Prize money

References

Virginia Slims Masters
Eckerd Open
Virginia Slims Masters
Virginia Slims Masters
Virginia Slims Masters